3 is the third album by queercore band The Butchies, released in 2001.

Track listing

References

2001 albums
The Butchies albums
Queercore albums
LGBT-related mass media in the United States